The 2018 Big West Conference men's volleyball tournament was a postseason men's volleyball tournament for the Big West Conference during the 2018 NCAA Division I & II men's volleyball season. It was held from April 19 through April 21, 2018 at Long Beach State University's Walter Pyramid. The winner received the conference's automatic bid to the 2018 NCAA Volleyball Tournament.

Seeds
All six teams were eligible for the postseason, with the top two seeds receiving byes to the semifinals. The top seed has home court hosting rights for the tournament. Teams were seeded by record within the conference, with a tiebreaker system to seed teams with identical conference records.

Schedule and results

Bracket

References

Big West Conference Men's Volleyball Tournament
Tournament
Big West Conference men's Tournament
Big West Conference men's volleyball tournament
Big West Conference men's volleyball tournament